Rudolf Ramseyer (17 September 1897 – 13 September 1943) was a Swiss association football player who competed in the 1924 Summer Olympics. He was a member of the Swiss team, which won the silver medal in the football tournament.

References

External links
profile

1897 births
1943 deaths
Swiss men's footballers
Footballers at the 1924 Summer Olympics
Footballers at the 1928 Summer Olympics
Olympic footballers of Switzerland
Olympic silver medalists for Switzerland
Switzerland international footballers
Olympic medalists in football
Association football defenders
Medalists at the 1924 Summer Olympics